The Lotus Eletre is an upcoming high-performance battery electric mid-size luxury crossover SUV to be produced by British sports car manufacturer Lotus Cars. It was revealed on 29 March 2022 as the company's first production SUV and its first vehicle produced in China.

Overview
Conceived by then-CEO of Lotus Jean-Marc Gales, the Lotus SUV project originally surfaced in 2016. Prior this project, Lotus had revealed the 2006 Lotus APX concept crossover SUV, the first SUV that the company had built. In 2020, it was revealed that the internal codename for the new SUV project was 'Lambda' and that the model will be revealed in 2022. Later in 2021, teasers for the SUV were released and the 'Type 132' codename name for the model was revealed. In February 2022, Lotus showed more teasers and revealed that the SUV would debut on 29 March 2022.

Ahead of its official debut, 3D patents published by the intellectual property office on 8 March revealed the Lotus Type 132, showing the SUV's coupe-like design. Later that month, the final production name of the Type 132 was revealed to be 'Eletre', consistent with the other mass-production Lotus model nameplates which all begin with the letter 'E'. The name of the car is derived from the Hungarian word "életre" which means "(coming) to life".

The Lotus Eletre was designed at the Geely Design Studio in Coventry and is produced in Wuhan, China.

Specifications

Battery and platform
Certain models have a  time of less than three seconds.

The Eletre is based on the Lotus Premium architecture for the company's future C-segment and E-segment electric models. After the Type 132, two more SUVs and a sports car are planned to be released.

Technology
In a teaser video released by Lotus, a LiDAR sensor is shown rising from the roof of the Lotus Eletre. Also shown through teasers are digital side mirrors and a floating infotainment system.

Type 134 
The Type 134 is a smaller EV SUV.

References

External links 

 Official website

Eletre
Cars introduced in 2022
Mid-size sport utility vehicles
Luxury crossover sport utility vehicles
Upcoming car models
All-wheel-drive vehicles